Orchidea De Santis (born 20 December 1948, Bari) is an Italian television and film actress.

Biography
Orchidea De Santis is an Italian actress in cinema, theatre and television. Her films include Il Vizio di Famiglia directed by Mariano Laurenti, Per Amare Ofelia by Flavio Mogherini, Concerto per Pistola Solista by Michele Lupo, Colpo di Stato by Luciano Salce (1969) and Paolo il caldo by Marco Vicario (1973). She appeared briefly in Il Nero by Giovanni Vento (1965) and Una Macchia Rosa  by Enzo Muzii (1970). Since the mid-1980s, her film work has declined in favor of other activities.

Her theater work includes comedies such as Morto un Papa se ne fa un Altro, Strega Roma  and  Chicchignola  written by Ettore Petrolini, all of which were directed by Ghigo De Chiara and Fiorenzo Fiorentini.

De Santis appeared in Sottoveste by Castellacci e Ventimiglia and Love and Life by Mike Immordino. She wrote and acted in  La Bambola Orchidea featuring the music of maestro Aldo Saitto, as well as Chicchignola  with Mario Scaccia, and La cicogna si diverte by Carlo Alighero.

For the RAI radio, De Santis  appeared in many roles, mainly in the  serials Barocco a Roma and Racconto Italiano which were broadcast in the late 1970s. In the 1989 she began working in the international broadcasting department  where she produced Notturno Italiano, AZ per gli Italiani all'Estero, Italia Canta, Itinerari Italiani, Facile Ascolto.

She was producer of the radio show L'Arca di Noè, and 13 episodes of Ciak si esegue. She also developed and produced a program about animals called L'Anello di Re Salomone. She is currently the director of, Due di Notte.

Her television work includes Roosvelt (Rai Tre 1986), Maga Circe and Lucrezia Borgia (Rai Uno 1987) and Il caso Redoli, a TV series: The Great Trials (Rai Uno 1996).

Outside of cinema and theater, she worked with the city government of Rome, organizing a review of 1970s Italian cinema called Italia (de)Genere.

Selected filmography
 I due figli di Ringo (1966)
 How I Learned to Love Women (1966)
 Psychopath (1968)
 The Weekend Murders (1970)
 A Suitcase for a Corpse (1970)
 Seven Murders for Scotland Yard (1971)
 Le calde notti del Decameron (1972)
 The Ribald Decameron (1972)
 Le mille e una notte all'italiana (1972)
 Devil in the Brain (1972)
 Alla mia cara mamma nel giorno del suo compleanno (1974)
 Per amare Ofelia  (1974)
 Charley's Nieces (1974)
 La nipote (1974)
 The Sensual Man (1974)
 Il vizio di famiglia (1975)
 L'ingenua (1975)
 Le dolci zie (1975)
 Una bella governante di colore (1976)
 La dottoressa sotto il lenzuolo (1976)
 L'appuntamento (1977)
 Tre sotto il lenzuolo (1980)
 Arrivano i gatti (1980)
 Close Friends (1992)

External links
Orchidea De Santis Official site

1948 births
Living people
People from Bari
Italian film actresses
Italian television actresses
20th-century Italian actresses
Italian stage actresses
Italian radio actresses